I'm Here to Help is the fifth comedy album and third DVD-comedy album by Scottish-American comedian Craig Ferguson. This live audio recording is from the film Craig Ferguson: I'm Here to Help, released on January 1, 2013, originally recorded in 2012 at the Warner Theatre.

Track listing

Award and nominations
The album was nominated for Best Comedy Album at the 56th Grammy Awards.

Charts

References

External links

Stand-up comedy concert films
2013 comedy films
Works by Craig Ferguson
Live comedy albums
Spoken word albums by American artists
Netflix specials
Stand-up comedy albums